A local election was held in the Mexican State of Sonora on Sunday, July 2, 2006. Voters went to the polls to elect, on the local level:

72 municipal presidents (mayors) to serve for a three-year term.
33 Deputies (21 by the first-past-the-post system and 12 by proportional representation) to serve for a three-year term in the Congress of Sonora.

External links
Electoral Institute of Sonora website

Sonora
Election